The Frederick A. Bailey House, located on U.S. Route 80 in Talbotton, Georgia, was built in 1837.  It was listed on the National Register of Historic Places in 1980.

It is a two-story weatherboard house built upon a brick pier foundation infilled with lattice slats.

References

		
National Register of Historic Places in Talbot County, Georgia
Greek Revival architecture in Georgia (U.S. state)
Houses completed in 1837